Logan Stanley (born May 26, 1998) is a Canadian professional ice hockey defenceman who is currently playing for the Winnipeg Jets of the National Hockey League (NHL). Stanley was drafted 18th overall in the 2016 NHL Entry Draft by the Jets.  He most recently played for the Kitchener Rangers of the Ontario Hockey League (OHL). Stanley was born in Kitchener, Ontario, and grew up in Waterloo, Ontario.

Playing career
Stanley played as a youth with the Waterloo Wolves in the AHMMPL, before he was selected in the first round, 12th overall in the 2014 OHL Priority draft by the Windsor Spitfires. On May 9, 2014, Stanley committed to the Spitfires of the OHL to play under Bob Boughner. Stanley has also been involved with IIHF tournaments and development camps.

On December 7, 2016, Stanley was signed to a three-year, entry-level contract with the Winnipeg Jets.

During the 2016–17 season, Stanley injured his knee in January and did not return to the lineup until April. On May 28, 2017, Stanley won the Memorial Cup Championship with the Windsor Spitfires.

On August 8, 2017, Stanley was traded to the Kitchener Rangers. Despite his trade, Stanley was awarded the Scott Miller Extra Mile Award by the Spitfires at the end of the season.

Due to his success, Stanley was invited to the Winnipeg Jets training camp before the 2017–18 NHL season, however, he failed to make the roster and was sent back to the OHL. During the 2017–18 OHL season, Stanley received a two-game suspension for head-checking Akil Thomas during a game against the Niagara IceDogs.  The Jets assigned Stanley to the Manitoba Moose after the Rangers were eliminated from the 2018 OHL playoffs.

After attending the Jets 2018 training camp, Stanley was reassigned to the Manitoba Moose to begin his first professional season. After finally cracking the Jets lineup for the 2020–21 NHL season, Stanley achieved a couple of career milestones in his rookie season; he had his first career fight on March 24, 2021, against Zack MacEwen of the Vancouver Canucks, and would later score his first NHL goal on March 27, 2021, scoring on David Rittich of the Calgary Flames in a 4–2 Jets loss.

On August 4, 2021, the Jets re-signed Stanley to a two-year, $1,8 million contract.

International play
Stanley played for Team Canada in the 2016 IIHF World U18 Championships. Stanley was invited to Canada's 2018 World Junior Ice Hockey Championships training camp but was cut before the final roster was announced.

Personal life
Stanley is a cousin to Michael Latta, a former NHL player for the Washington Capitals.

Career statistics

Regular season and playoffs

International

References

External links

1998 births
Living people
Canadian ice hockey defencemen
Ice hockey people from Ontario
Kitchener Rangers players
Manitoba Moose players
National Hockey League first-round draft picks
Sportspeople from Kitchener, Ontario
Sportspeople from Waterloo, Ontario
Windsor Spitfires players
Winnipeg Jets draft picks
Winnipeg Jets players